Captain John Heth (1798 – April 30, 1842) was a Virginian naval officer and businessman in the Coal mining industry.

Biography 
Heth was born in 1798 at Black Heath estate in Chesterfield County, Virginia. He was the son of Colonel Henry "Harry" Heth, who had fought in the American Revolutionary War and established himself in the coal business in Virginia, and Nancy Hare Heth. He was named for his father's brother, Lt. John Heth, who had also fought in the Revolutionary War and afterwards settled in the Richmond area.

War of 1812 
John Heth served in the volunteer forces of Virginia as an officer in the U.S. Navy in the War of 1812, achieving the rank of Captain. On January 15, 1815, he was captured with Commodore Stephen Decatur Jr., the commander of the U.S. frigate President and taken to Bermuda with Decatur and his crew as a prisoner of war. With two others, Captain Heth escaped from Bermuda in an open boat.

Coal Industry 
After the war, Heth operated the Black Heath coal pits near present-day Midlothian, a business inherited from his father, who died in 1821. Under his management, the mines expanded and eventually became the standard coal of the U.S. Navy. In 1832, he petitioned the Virginia General Assembly to form the first coal mining corporation in the state, and succeeded, despite protests, the following year. After two serious fatal accidents from explosions in 1839 and 1844, the Black Heath pits were closed until 1938.

Family and children 
Captain Heth married Margaret L. Pickett (1801-1850) of Richmond on May 15, 1822. Pickett was the sister of Robert Pickett, who, with his wife Mary, was the father of Confederate general George Pickett. They had 11 children between 1823 and 1842, including future Confederate Major General Henry Heth, who was born at Black Heath in 1825.<

Their 11 children included: 
Margaret Helen Heth (1823-1855), married to Thomas Lynch Hamilton
Ann Eliza Heth (1824-1825)
Henry "Harry" Heth (1825-1899), married Harriet C. "Teny" Selden (1834-1907) and had three children
Lavinia Randolph Heth (1827-1865), married Julien Harrison (1827-1877) and had seven children
Elizabeth Chevallie Heth (1829-1904), married Thomas Vaden and had seven children
John Randolph Heth (1834-1890)
Catherine "Kitty" Heth (1834-1912), married John Cringan Maynard
Caroline Kemble Heth (1835-1859), married Walter K. Martin
Mary Ann Heth (1837-1920)
Beverley Stockton Heth (1839-1927)
Fanny Cadwallader Heth (1842-?)

Death 
Heth died on April 30, 1842 at Norwood Plantation in Powhatan County, Virginia, and was buried there.

References

1798 births
1842 deaths
People from Chesterfield County, Virginia
American people of English descent
United States Navy officers
United States Navy personnel of the War of 1812
War of 1812 prisoners of war held by the United Kingdom